Dr. Frank Mickens (June 22, 1946July 9, 2009), was a nationally recognized New York City educator as principal of Boys and Girls High School at 1700 Fulton Street in the Bedford-Stuyvesant neighborhood of Brooklyn. The seventeenth largest high school in the United States, Boys and Girls High School has a student population of over four thousand students. Boys and Girls High School was built in the 1970s as a model 'education option' school, and Mickens successfully embraced this initiative as an administrator in the New York City Department of Education. His cigar-chomping tough no-nonsense 'take charge' clawhammer approach earned Mickens 'tough love' comparisons to Joe Louis Clark and the controversial nickname 'The Chancellor of Fulton Street'.

Early life
Mickens mother was a teacher. He was a graduate of Erasmus Hall High School in Brooklyn. He earned a B.A. in History from SUNY Potsdam, and a Master's degree from New York University. In 1968 at 22, he began teaching at Boys High School, and served as boys baseball and basketball coach 1969-1979, leading the Kangaroos to the 1979 PSAL boys basketball championship, and also served as academic dean of students. He completed postgraduate work at Columbia University, and later attended the Principal's Center at Harvard University. In 1982, he became principal of a Junior High School 324 in Bedford-Stuyvesant, and later was principal of Martin Luther King High School (New York) in Manhattan. In 1980, he became men's basketball coach at Borough of Manhattan Community College.

Later achievements
In 1986, he became principal of Boys and Girls High School, which had a graduation rate of 24.4 percent. By 2004, the year Mickens retired, the high school graduation rate had risen to 47.7 percent with 85% of graduates headed to college. For eighteen years, Mickens worked twelve-hour days, seven days a week, and frequently patrolled the perimeter of the high school with a clawhammer, and patrolled the hallways with a walkie-talkie, clipboard and a bullhorn. His aim was to create a college preparatory environment of excellence, self-esteem and safety for his students.

In 2001-2002, he was a Charles Revson Fellow at Columbia University. Medgar Evers College awarded him an honorary degree of letters. Mickens also lectured in the Graduate School of Education at Long Island University.

He also served simultaneously as an Assistant Superintendent in the Brooklyn High Schools, helping to set curriculum and policy standards, and plan future academics.

Mickens unorthodox administrative style attracted controversy-and lawsuits- by instituting codes of conduct, a blouse skirt/shirt and tie dress code that he called dress for success and long suspensions for infractions of the rules. He had teachers posted outside school every morning to discourage trouble, as well as having various MTA buses waiting after school so students wouldn't have to wait in this rough neighborhood. His disciplinary code included no hats, no listening to a walkman, no gold teeth caps, no excessive jewelry, and no sneakers with lights. He also had inspirational banners all over the school to remind the students to always do their best. The lawsuits against Mickens stemmed from his moving troublesome students into programs from which they did not graduate, and were not finally settled until four years after his retirement.

Death
Mickens, who was divorced and lost his only son in a car accident at a young age, was found dead at age 63 at his home in Bedford-Stuyvesant Brooklyn of natural causes on July 9, 2009. An only child, he is survived by his cousins, Sharon Rose-Calhoun of Brooklyn, New York, and Pamela Tranberg of Crete, Illinois. A memorial page has been set up on Facebook by over 500 former students and colleagues.
An alumni and staff memorial service was held at Boys and Girls High School, followed by a funeral at Pentecostal Elim Fellowship in Bedford-Stuyvesant. Eulogies were given by the Rev. Al Sharpton, City Controller Bill Thompson (New York) and Brooklyn Borough President Marty Markowitz. Mickens was buried wearing his trademark suit and bowtie and holding his trademark cigar.

Books by Frank Mickens
It Doesn't Have To Be That Way: A Positive Environment in Our Schools by Frank Mickens
My Way: The Leadership Style of an Urban High School Principal by Frank Mickens

References

Frank Mickens
Frank Mickens
Frank Mickens
Frank Mickens
Frank Mickens 
Frank Mickens
Al Sharpton Eulogy
Boys and Girls High School

1946 births
2009 deaths
People from Bedford–Stuyvesant, Brooklyn
State University of New York at Potsdam alumni
New York University alumni
Columbia University alumni
Harvard Graduate School of Education alumni
20th-century American educators
Educators from New York City
American school principals